CREW is a Belgian performance group, founded in Brussels in 1991 by Eric Joris. CREW operates on the border between art and science, between performance art and new technology. Artist Eric Joris develops his live-art projects in close collaboration with scientists and other artists.

CREW's shows range from one-to-one performances, staged performances and visual arts installations to scientific research set-ups and interventions in public spaces. CREW's work has been presented on stages across Europe, at large public events from Brussels to the Shanghai World Expo, and at scientific conferences in Europe, China and the U.S.

CREW is artistic partner in the EU-funded multidisciplinary research consortium Dreamspace, which develops tools that enable creative professionals to combine live performances, video and computer generated imagery in real time.

'AltR'
CREW creates immersion-based performance and was the first to combine 360° Omni Directional Video (ODV) and Head-mounted display (HMD) for delivering an 'Alternative Reality' ('AltR'). Unlike sitting and standing virtual reality applications, CREW's work delivers 'AltR' which is anchored in the physical: the 'immersant' experiences the virtual world by moving, walking and running. This resulted in the 2004 Crash, a performance piece in which embodiment was a key element. A playful use of real time versus prerecorded material typified the work of this period and turned the 'immersants' into real protagonists. 'Headswap' sessions allowed integration of out-of-body phenomena into performances like Double U (2008).
Terra Nova gave 55 people an immersive experience in the course of a ninety-minute show.

From CAVE to C.a.p.e.

In 2000 CREW built a performance Cave automatic virtual environment large enough to include actors, artists, technicians and an audience of fifty. CREW's inspiration came from a theatre technician, Paul Antipoff, who was paralysed from the neck down and survived through a symbiosis with technology. The University of Hasselt developed a PC-driven CAVE, with a 3D real-time painting tool, and a robotic leg. Antipoff was able to 'handle' his computer, electric wheelchair and robotic leg with tools attached to his head and mouth. Immersed with the audience in the CAVE, Antipoff started to paint and to interact with a live virtual actor and with the audience.

In 2002 Eric Joris and Kurt Vanhoutte (University of Antwerp) wanted to create a medium ‘like a prosthesis’ based upon Joris' work with the paraplegic actor. Eric Joris sought to combine 360° Omni Directional Video (ODV) with a head-mounted display (HMD) and a tracking system instead of using computer graphics or ‘virtual reality’ tools (as in Computer Caves). EDM/University of Hasselt developed not only the camera but the whole system and software around. Their collaboration resulted in immersive performance like Crash,U, EUX and Terra Nova. Their system led to many new applications. Ever since Omni Directional Video (360°) grew popular and the University of Hasselt made a first spin-off, centering on a 16head camerasystem for sports events.

Because the live performances were technically, financially and logistically demanding CREW and EDM/University of Hasselt developed a new configuration: C.a.p.e. / Computer Assisted Personal Environment. It is a lightweight version consisting of a backpack with a PC, a head-mounted display using prerecorded material for 15 minute walks or experiences of fictional, documentary and musical nature. C.a.p.e. premiered at the Shanghai World Expo in 2010. C.a.p.e. comes in many versions: C.a.p.e. Brussels, C.a.p.e. Tohoku, C.a.p.e. KIT, C.a.p.e. Horror, C.a.p.e. Vooruit and C.a.p.e. Anima.

A new version of fully navigable 'AltR' (Alternative Reality), making use of lightfield capture is being investigated by CREW and University of Hasselt/iMinds with the FP7 ICT Dreamspace consortium.

Productions
 Absence, 2015 (Eric Joris and Peter Verhelst), production by CREW Eric Joris and NTGent
 EXPLORER/Prometheus Unchained, 2015 (Eric Joris and Urland), production by CREW Eric Joris and Productiehuis Rotterdam
 C.a.p.e. Anima, 2014 (creation by CREW and Anima Eterna Brugge), conducted by Jos van Immerseel, commissioned by Concertgebouw Brugge
 Centrifuga, 2013
 C.a.p.e. Vooruit/STAM, 2013
 aXes, 2013
 C.a.p.e. KIT, 2013 (Eric Joris and Chantalla Pleiter)
 C.a.p.e. Tohoku, 2012
 NoHorizon, 2012
 C.a.p.e. Pierrefonds, 2010
 BOLSCAN, 2010
 Line-Up, 2009
 EUX, 2009
 W(Double U), 2008
 O_Rex,1.3., 2008
 U_Ranging Standstill, 2006
 Crash, 2004
 Philoctetes, 2002
 Icarus, 2001
 N.M., 2001
 Kammerspiel, 1999
 Kaufhaus Inferno, 1999

References

Further Reading
 Maaike Bleeker, Jon Foley Sherman, Eirini Nedelkopolou (editors).Performance and phenomenology. Traditions and Transformations, Routledge, 2015. 
 Eric Joris (propos recueilli et trasncrit par Mireille Losco-Lena et Izabella Pluta).LIVE ARTS,LIVE MEDIA, recherche scientifique versus recherche artistique dans le travail de la compagnie CREW Eric Joris, "Ligeia", 2015
 Eirini Nedelkopoulou, Mary Oliver.Editorial, International Journal of Performance Arts and Digital Media, 10:2, 125-129, DOI:10.1080/14794713.2014.946265,  (Print).
 Catherine Bouko.Interactivity and immersion in a media-based performance,Participations Journal of audience and reception studies, Volume 11, Issue 1.
 Bleumers, L.,Van den Broeck, W.,Lievens, B., and Pierson,J.Extending the field of view: a human-centred design perspective on 360°TV, Behaviour & Information Technology, 33(8), 800-814, 2014.
 Nele Wijnants.De binnenkant van het beeld: een kunsthistorisch onderzoek naar immersie, theatraliteit en ervaring, Antwerp, Universiteit Antwerpen, Faculteit Letteren & Wijsbegeerte, 2013
 Decock,J.,Van Looy,J.,Bleumers,L.,Bekaert,P.The Pleasure of Being (There?):An Exlorative Study into the Effects of Presence and Identification on the Enjoyment of an Interactive Theatrical Performance using Omni-Directional Video, AI & Society, 2013. 
 Bleumers,L., Lievens,B., Pierson,J. From Sensory Dream to Television Format: Gathering User Feedback on the Use and Experience of Omnidirectional Video-based Solutions, Proceedings of the International Society for Presence Research Annual Conference, Edinburgh, Scotland: Edinburgh Napier University, 2011.
 Sigrid Merx. From doing to performing phenomenology: implications and possibilities, in: Foundations of Science, Vol.16.3, 2011
 Vanhoutte, Kurt. Wijnants, Nele. Performing phenomenology: negotiating presence in intermedial theatre, in: Foundation of Science,  - 16:2-3, pp.275-284, 2011.
 Klich, R and Scheer, E. Multimedia Performance. Basingstoke: Palgrave, 2011.
 Catherine, Bouko and Natacha, Slater.Identity, Otherness and the virtual double, Technoetic Arts: a journal of speculative research, Vol.9., N°1, pp.17-30,2011.
 Vanhoutte, Kurt.Two-fold origin: performing hybrids between theatre and media. Contemporary theatre review,  -20:4, pp.475-485, 2010.
 Vanhoutte, Kurt. Wijnants, Nele.Instance: the work of CREW with Eric Joris Mapping intermediality in performance/Bay-Cheng, Sarah/edit., Amsterdam, 2010, pp. 69–75, .
 Vanhoutte, Kurt. Wijnants, Nele.Pending Presence: negotiating the space in between
 Van Klaveren, Rosanne. Hendriks, Niels. Space cowboys: how art creates, networks and visualises hybrid spaces, Genk, Media and Design Academy,pp. 58–72, 2009.

External links

Sources
 
 
 
 
 
 
 
 
 
 
 
 

Video art
Theatre companies in Belgium